Konstantinos Dovas (20 December 1898 – 1973) was a Greek general and interim Prime Minister.

Dovas was born in Konitsa, in the Janina Vilayet of the Ottoman Empire (present-day northwestern Greece). In 1918, Dovas graduated from the Hellenic Military Academy. During the Greek Civil War between the government and the communist Democratic Army of Greece, he led the resistance of the Konitsa garrison during the Battle of Konitsa. Subsequently he rose from the rank of Lieutenant General (1954) to Chief of the Hellenic National Defense General Staff.

During his term of office, on 25 March 1955 an agreement between the Army and the CIA on the establishment of a special force entitled "Sheepskin" was made, which subsequently became the Greek component of Gladio, a secret organisation of NATO, CIA and MI6.

After his retirement from the army, he was Chief of the Royal Household of King Paul of Greece.

From 20 September to 4 November 1961, Dovas was prime minister in a transitional government.

External links 
 Listing in rulers.org
 "Out in the Open", TIME, 5 January 1948

1898 births
1973 deaths
20th-century prime ministers of Greece
Hellenic Army generals
Prime Ministers of Greece
Greeks from the Ottoman Empire
People from Konitsa
People from Janina vilayet
Chiefs of the Hellenic National Defence General Staff
Greek Resistance members
Greek military personnel of the Greek Civil War
1960s in Greek politics
Greek military personnel of World War I
Greek military personnel of World War II
Greek military personnel of the Greco-Turkish War (1919–1922)